is a Japanese sprinter. He won a gold medal in the 200 metres at the 2018 Asian Games.

International competitions

1Did not start in the semi-finals
2Did not finish in the final

Personal bests
Outdoors
100 metres – 9.98 (+0.5 m/s, London 2019)
200 metres – 20.23 (+0.7 m/s, Jakarta 2018)
400 metres – 46.87 (Fukuroi 2015)

References

External links

1995 births
Living people
Japanese male sprinters
Athletes (track and field) at the 2018 Asian Games
People from Otaru
Asian Games medalists in athletics (track and field)
Asian Games gold medalists for Japan
Asian Games bronze medalists for Japan
Medalists at the 2018 Asian Games
World Athletics Championships athletes for Japan
World Athletics Championships medalists
Asian Games gold medalists in athletics (track and field)
Competitors at the 2015 Summer Universiade
Athletes (track and field) at the 2020 Summer Olympics
Olympic athletes of Japan
Universiade medalists in athletics (track and field)
Universiade gold medalists for Japan
20th-century Japanese people
21st-century Japanese people